Anthony Rech (born July 9, 1992) is a French professional ice hockey forward who is currently an unrestricted free agent. He most recently played for the Iserlohn Roosters of the Deutsche Eishockey Liga (DEL). Rech is also a member of the French national team.

Playing career

After spending the first 8 years of his professional career in the French Ligue Magnus, Rech opted to continue his career in Germany, agreeing to a one-year contract after a successful try-out tenure with the Schwenninger Wild Wings of the Deutsche Eishockey Liga (DEL) on September 4, 2017.

Following the conclusion of his contract with the Wild Wings at the completion of the 2018–19 season, Rech left the club as a free agent and signed a one-year contract to remain in the DEL, joining Grizzlys Wolfsburg on March 12, 2019.

Rech played three season with Grizzlys Wolfsburg before leaving the club as a free agent following the 2021–22 season. On 22 June 2022, Rech was signed to a one-year contract in joining Finnish club, HC TPS of the Liiga.

In the 2022–23 season, Rech made 29 appearances with TPS, contributing with 7 goals and 11 points before he opted to leave Finland and return to Germany in signing for the remainder of the season with the Iserlohn Roosters on 5 January 2023. He recorded 2 points in 16 games unable to help prevent Iserlohn missing the playoffs for the second consecutive season. Rech left the club at the conclusion of his contract on March 10, 2023.

International play
Rech participated for the French national team at the 2015 IIHF World Championship and the 2018 IIHF World Championship.

References

External links

1992 births
Living people
Dragons de Rouen players
Ducs de Dijon players
French ice hockey forwards
Grizzlys Wolfsburg players
Sportspeople from Haute-Savoie
Iserlohn Roosters players
Rapaces de Gap players
Schwenninger Wild Wings players
HC TPS players